George Groves (June 10, 1921 – July 23, 2011) was a professional American football guard.

Biography
Groves was born George Noah Groves June 10, 1921, in Hammond, Indiana. He died July 23, 2011, in Mexico, Missouri.

Career
Groves played professionally with the Cleveland Browns, Buffalo Bills and the Baltimore Colts of the All-America Football Conference in 1946 1947 and 1948. Previously, he had been drafted in the thirty-second round of the 1945 NFL Draft by the Chicago Bears.

He played at the collegiate level at Marquette University.

References

Sportspeople from Hammond, Indiana
Buffalo Bills (AAFC) players
Baltimore Colts (1947–1950) players
American football offensive guards
Marquette Golden Avalanche football players
1921 births
2011 deaths
Sportspeople from the Chicago metropolitan area